Magnolia Field is a 120-seat baseball park in Itta Bena, Mississippi. It is home to the Mississippi Valley State Delta Devils baseball team of the NCAA Division I Southwestern Athletic Conference. The venue has a capacity of 120 spectators.

See also
 Mississippi Valley State Delta Devils baseball

References

College baseball venues in the United States
Baseball venues in Mississippi
Mississippi Valley State Delta Devils baseball